@fire International Disaster Response Germany (@fire Internationaler Katastrophenschutz Deutschland) is a German non-profit, non-governmental civil protection organisation which assists during natural disasters. The organisation was founded in 2002 in Wallenhorst, Germany as a pro bono network of professional and volunteer firefighters. Since 2010 @fire is member of the UN-Organisation INSARAG (International Search and Rescue Advisory Group).

Tasks 
The aid organization is specialized in international USAR (Urban Search and Rescue) and wildland firefighting operations.

Urban Search and Rescue 

During USAR-operations @fire is acting on the INSARAG-Guidelines and is therefore prepared to deploy a fully equipped USAR Team within 36 hours after an official request for international aid by the host country.

In order to locate victims buried beneath the rubble, the search teams are equipped with acoustic and optical search devices as well as search and rescue dogs.

To extract located victims the rescue squad uses larger-scale equipment such as concrete chain saws, rotary cutting tools and core drilling machines.

Wildland firefighting 
@fire is able to rapidly deploy small wildland firefighting hand crews to support local firefighting agencies during serious wildfires.

Those crews are trained to fight fires with a minimum amount of water by using hand tools and small pickup-based tankers.

Members 
@fire Members are volunteers from Germany, Switzerland and Austria. Most Members are volunteer or professional firefighters, but also paramedics and members of the "Technisches Hilfswerk" (Federal Agency for Technical Relief, THW) participate in the network.

All members are specially trained for their scope e.g. the  technical search of trapped victims. This training is based on the training the members already received in the fire department, following the INSARAG-Guidelines and the specifications of the National Wildfire Coordinating Group (National Wildfire Coordinating Group).

Operations 
 2005 Kashmir earthquake
 Wildfires in the USA 2005, 2006, 2007, 2009, 2010 und 2011
 Wildfires in Portugal 2006, 2007, 2011, 2012 und 2013
 2010 Haiti earthquake
 2013 German floods
 2014 Bosnian floods
 2014 Västmanland wildfire
 2015 Nepal earthquake
 August 2020, Beyrouth

References

External links 
 @fire Internationaler Katastrophenschutz Deutschland e.V.

Firefighting
Non-profit organisations based in Lower Saxony
2002 establishments in Germany
Disaster management
Humanitarian aid organizations in Europe
Emergency organizations